Felaoucene District is a district of Tlemcen Province in north-western Algeria.

Districts of Tlemcen Province